The 2022–23 season is the Persepolis's 22nd season in the Persian Gulf Pro League, and their 40th consecutive season in the top division of Iranian Football. In addition to the domestic league, Persepolis will also participate in this season's Hazfi Cup competitions.

Squad

New Contracts

Transfers

In

Out

Technical staff 

  Jalal Hosseini

|}

|}

Pre-season and friendlies

Pre-season

Friendlies

Competitions

Overview

Persian Gulf Pro League

Results summary

Results by round

League table

Matches

Score overview

Hazfi Cup

Statistics

Goal scorers

Assists

Goalkeeping

Playing statistics

|-
!colspan=13 |Goalkepeer

|-
!colspan=13 |Defenders

|-
!colspan=13 |Midfielders

|-
!colspan=13 |Forwards

|-
|-align="left" style="background:#DCDCDC"
! colspan="22"|Last updated: 11 March 2023
|}

Disciplinary record
Includes all competitive matches. Players with 1 card or more are included only.

The best of week

Man of the Match

Player of the Week

Team of the Week

Club

Kit

Sponsorship

References

External links 
Iran Premier League Statistics
Persian League
Persepolis News
varzesh3

2022-23
Iranian football clubs 2022–23 season